Boutique amplifier is a catch-all descriptor for any type of instrument amplifier that is typically hand built with the intention of being much better than the mass-produced variety offered by large companies. In the majority of cases, this is reflected in the price. Sometimes they are clones of older designs, often with minor improvements or alterations in layout or circuit design; sometimes they are new designs altogether.

The boutique term are also used among effect pedals, such as the manufacturer Analog Man.

History
California company Mesa Boogie can lay claim to being perhaps the earliest boutique amp company: their late 1960s Mark series, based on the ubiquitous Fender Princeton "study" amp but "hot-rodded", quickly established a reputation for tone and volume, and was used by, among others, Carlos Santana.

Since the advent of the boutique amp age, larger companies have released reissues of their classic designs, touting their faithfulness to the original sound and the labor-intensive building process.

Common elements
Some common features of boutique amplifiers include point-to-point or turret board construction, heavy-duty chassis, NOS vacuum tubes, and high-end electronic parts and speakers.

Notable manufacturers

65amps
Bogner Amplification
Carr Amplifiers
Dumble Amplifiers
Fryette Amplification
Gjika Amplification
Matchless Amplifiers
Trainwreck Circuits

See also
Tube sound

References

Instrument amplifiers